Mark Anthony McCants (born February 17, 1958) is a former American football safety and return specialist who played 3 seasons for the Philadelphia/Baltimore Stars. He was originally drafted by the Atlanta Falcons in the 12th round (330th overall) in the 1981 NFL Draft.

References

Further reading

1958 births
Living people
Philadelphia Stars players
Temple Owls football players
American football safeties
African-American players of American football
Players of American football from Pennsylvania
21st-century African-American people